Mike Hunter (born 1947) was a Liberal member of the Legislative Assembly of British Columbia for the riding of Nanaimo, he served in that capacity from 2001 to 2005.

Prior to becoming a politician, Hunter was the head of the British Columbia Fisheries Council, an industry association of companies active in the west coast fishery of Canada.  He was also involved with the British Columbia Seafood Sector Council, a joint business-labour organization that promoted collaborative solutions to problems in the British Columbia seafood processing industry.

In the 2005 provincial election, Hunter lost his seat to former NDP leadership candidate Leonard Krog.

External links
 Mike Hunter
Hunter, Michael, B.A., M.A. (Nanaimo)

1947 births
Living people
British Columbia Liberal Party MLAs
English emigrants to Canada
People from Nanaimo
21st-century Canadian politicians